Beaucaire station (French: Gare de Beaucaire) is a railway station in Beaucaire, Gard, Occitanie, southern France. Within TER Occitanie, it is part of line 21 (Narbonne–Avignon).

References

Railway stations in Gard
Beaucaire, Gard